Bugoye Power Station is a  mini hydroelectric power station in Uganda. In the literature, Bugoye Power Station is sometimes referred to as Mubuku II Power Station.

Location
The power station is located across the Mubuku River, in Bugoye, Kasese District, in Western Uganda. This location lies in the foothills of the Rwenzori Mountains, close to the border with the Democratic Republic of the Congo.

Overview
The Bugoye Hydropower Project, is a run of the river mini-hydropower installation, with installed capacity of 13 MW.

The power station is owned and operated by TronderEnergi, a Norwegian power company. Construction began in March 2008 and the plant was commissioned 19 months later in October 2009. Bugoye Power Station is the third mini-hydropower station on River Mubuku. The other two are Mubuku I Power Station, owned by Kilembe Mines Limited (KML), with installed capacity of 5 MW and Mubuku III Power Station, owned by Kasese Cobalt Company Limited (KCCL), with installed capacity of 10 MW.

Construction costs
The estimated costs for the dam and power plant is approximately US$35 million. The funding was facilitated by a loan from the  Emerging Africa Infrastructure Fund, (EAIF). This does not include the construction of a 33kV transmission power line linking the power station to the substation where the power is integrated into the national grid. The power line was funded by a grant from the Government of Norway to the Government of Uganda. By mutual consent between the two governments,  Tronder Power Limited, assumed the responsibility of developing, constructing, maintaining and servicing the power line. Tronder Power Limited is a Ugandan company co-owned by TronderEnergi and Norfund.

See also

Uganda power stations
Africa hydropower stations
Hima
Hydroelectric stations
Western Uganda

References

External links
 Location of Bugoye Power Station At Google Maps

Energy infrastructure completed in 2009
Hydroelectric power stations in Uganda
Kasese District
Western Region, Uganda